Lachlan Fogarty (born 1 April 1999) is a professional Australian rules footballer playing for the Carlton Football Club in the Australian Football League (AFL). He was drafted by Geelong with their first selection and twenty-second overall in the 2017 national draft. He made his debut in the three point win against  at the Melbourne Cricket Ground in the opening round of the 2018 season.

References

External links

1999 births
Living people
Geelong Football Club players
Western Jets players
Australian rules footballers from Victoria (Australia)
People educated at St Kevin's College, Melbourne
Carlton Football Club players